The 2016 Washington Redskins season was the franchise's 85th season in the National Football League, the 20th playing their home games at FedExField and the third under head coach Jay Gruden.

The season saw the Redskins play in London for the first time in franchise history, where they tied the Cincinnati Bengals 27–27.

After a disappointing loss in the final week to the New York Giants, the Redskins were eliminated from playoff contention. Despite missing the playoffs, the Redskins finished the season with a record of 8–7–1, which was the first consecutive winning seasons for the team since the 1996 and 1997 seasons. Along with the Philadelphia Eagles, Washington was the only team in 2016 that played seven regular-season games against teams that would reach the playoffs: four games combined against Dallas and the New York Giants, games against Green Bay and Detroit (as the NFC North was the only division besides the NFC East to send more than one team to the 2016 postseason) and a game against the sole AFC North 2016 playoff team (Pittsburgh); the Redskins' 2–5 record in these contests was a major reason they did not return to the playoffs.

Off-season changes

Free agency 
All 2015 contracts expired to coincide with the beginning of the 2016 NFL League Year at 4:00 EDT on March 9, 2016. However, before that date, all teams had until March 1 to place the franchise tag on a player, and could begin negotiations with a player's agent on March 7.

Waivers and releases 
On March 8, the Redskins released S Dashon Goldson, DE Jason Hatcher, QB Robert Griffin III, and S Jeron Johnson.

On April 14, the Redskins waived OLB Jackson Jeffcoat.

Team re-signings/contract extensions

Free agency transactions

2016 Draft

The 2016 NFL Draft occurred from April 28 to April 30, 2016. Going into the draft, the Redskins had eight selections, two of which were from another team: the additional seventh-round (#232) selection from the Dashon Goldson trade in 2015 and a sixth-round selection (#187) from the New Orleans Saints (the Redskins sent their sixth-round selection to Tampa Bay as part of the Goldson trade).

During the draft, the Redskins swapped first-round selections (#21 for #22) with the Houston Texans in exchange for their 2017 sixth-round selection, traded their 2016 fourth round selection (#120) to the New Orleans Saints in exchange for the Saints' fifth-round selections in 2016 (#152) and 2017, and traded their fifth-round selection (#158) to the New York Jets in exchange for their 2017 fourth-round selection.

Undrafted free agents 
After the draft, the Redskins signed 14 undrafted college free agents to the team as part of the off season roster:

Staff

Final roster

Schedule

Preseason

Regular season

Note: Intra-division opponents are in bold text.

Game summaries

Week 1: vs. Pittsburgh Steelers

The Redskins entered this Week 1 matchup against the Steelers having lost five consecutive games against Pittsburgh dating back to 1991. They scored an average of 8.2 points per game in those five losses. The Redskins' 22-point defeat was their worst in a Week 1 game in 15 years. It was also their worst opening day home loss since 1966.

The Redskins defense had a very hard time containing DeAngelo Williams as he exploded for 143 rushing yards and the Steelers explosive receiving corps of Antonio Brown and Eli Rogers who would go on to have strong performances.

Week 2: vs. Dallas Cowboys

Week 3: at New York Giants

With the win, the Redskins improved 1-2 and won at MetLife Stadium for the first time since 2011.

Week 4: vs. Cleveland Browns
{{Americanfootballbox
 |titlestyle=;text-align:center;
 |state=autocollapse
 |title=Week Four: Cleveland Browns at Washington Redskins – Game summary
 |date=October 2
 |time=1:00 p.m. EDT
 |road=Browns
 |R1=0|R2=17|R3=3|R4=0
 |home=Redskins
 |H1=14|H2=3|H3=0|H4=14
 |stadium=FedExField, Landover, Maryland
 |attendance=76,249
 |weather=, cloudy
 |referee=Jeff Triplette
 |TV=CBS
 |TVAnnouncers=Kevin Harlan and Rich Gannon
 |reference=Recap, Gamebook
 |scoring=
First quarter
WAS – Jordan Reed 8-yard pass from Kirk Cousins (Dustin Hopkins kick), 7:40. Redskins 7–0. Drive: 12 plays, 75 yards, 7:20.
WAS – Jordan Reed 9-yard pass from Kirk Cousins (Dustin Hopkins kick), 0:27. Redskins 14–0. Drive: 8 plays, 80 yards, 4:14.
Second quarter
CLE – Isaiah Crowell 2-yard run (Cody Parkey kick), 9:33. Redskins 14–7. Drive: 12 plays, 81 yards, 5:54.
CLE – Terrelle Pryor 9-yard pass from Cody Kessler (Cody Parkey kick), 7:55. Tied 14–14. Drive: 3 plays, 12 yards, 1:25.
WAS – Dustin Hopkins 49-yard field goal, 2:29. Redskins 17–14. Drive: 10 plays, 32 yards, 5:26.
CLE – Cody Parkey 51-yard field goal, 0:00. Tied 17–17. Drive: 7 plays, 42 yards, 2:29.
Third quarter
CLE – Cody Parkey 45-yard field goal, 9:25. Browns 20–17. Drive: 11 plays, 48 yards, 5:35.
Fourth quarter
WAS – Chris Thompson 5-yard pass from Kirk Cousins (Dustin Hopkins kick), 10:39. ''Redskins 24–20 Drive: 10 plays, 91 yards, 5:28
WAS – Matt Jones 1-yard run (Dustin Hopkins kick), 4:25. Redskins 31–20. Drive: 4 plays, 39 yards, 2:03.
 |stats=Top passersCLE – Cody Kessler – 28/40, 223 yards, TD, INT
WAS – Kirk Cousins – 21/27, 183 yards, 3 TD, INTTop rushersCLE – Isaiah Crowell – 15 rushes, 112 yards, TD
WAS – Matt Jones – 22 rushes, 117 yards, TDTop receiversCLE – Gary Barnidge – 7 receptions, 57 yards
WAS – Jordan Reed – 9 receptions, 73 yards, 2 TD
}}

Week 5: at Baltimore Ravens

Week 6: vs. Philadelphia Eagles

Week 7: at Detroit Lions

The Redskins rallied with a late touchdown run by Cousins, but the Lions responded with Matthew Stafford throwing the game winner to Anquan Boldin, thus ending the Redskins winning streak.

Week 8: at Cincinnati BengalsNFL International SeriesHoping to rebound from their loss to the Detroit Lions, the Redskins played in the third and final game of the year in London against the Cincinnati Bengals. With a few minutes left in overtime, Dustin Hopkins missed a game-winning field goal and allowed the Bengals to take over. After that, Bengals' Andy Dalton fumbled and allowed the Redskins to take back the ball. A Hail Mary attempt failed, making the Redskins tie for the first time since 1997 when they tied 7–7 against the Giants.

Week 10: vs. Minnesota Vikings

After their tie against the Bengals and their bye week, the Redskins came back home to host the Minnesota Vikings on Homecoming Weekend. After allowing the Vikings to score 20 unanswered points to end the first half, the Redskins shut out the Vikings 12-0 in the second half, improving to 5-3-1 on the season.

Week 11: vs. Green Bay Packers

The Redskins avenged their 35–18 loss to the Packers in the wildcard round of last season's playoffs by beating them 42–24. They also were the last team to beat the Packers, as they went on a 6-game winning streak to finish the season.

Week 12: at Dallas CowboysThanksgiving Day game'''

An attempted rally by the offense did not pay off. The Redskins dropped to 6–4–1 and were swept by the Cowboys for the first time since 2013.

Week 13: at Arizona Cardinals

Kirk Cousins attempted to drive down the field but was intercepted by Patrick Peterson to seal the second straight loss for the Washington Redskins. With the loss, the 'Skins dropped to 6-5-1 and allowed the Cowboys to clinch a playoff spot by virtue of the loss.

Week 14: at Philadelphia Eagles

The Redskins rebounded from a disappointing loss at Arizona to break their two-game losing streak. Chris Thompson scored the game-winning touchdown, while Ryan Kerrigan sealed the game with a strip sack of Carson Wentz.

Week 15: vs. Carolina Panthers

Josh Norman's revenge against his former team came up short in an abysmal Monday Night performance by the Redskins.

Week 16: at Chicago Bears

Week 17: vs. New York Giants

With their playoff hopes on the line, the Redskins hosted the 10-5 New York Giants. The Redskins were pressured all day and two picks by Dominique Rodgers-Cromartie made the Redskins miss out on the playoffs.

Standings

Division

Conference

Notes

References

External links

 

Washington
Washington Redskins seasons
Washington Redskins